Deschampsia chapmanii is a plant species in the grass (Poaceae) family, native to New Zealand and Macquarie Island.

Etymology 
The genus, Deschampsia, was named for Louis Auguste Deschamps who served as surgeon (and botanist) in the expedition of d'Entrecasteaux in search of La Pérouse, while the specific epithet, chapmanii, honours F.R. Chapman who collected the type specimen.

Conservation status
This species has been listed as "Not Threatened" (2004, 2009, 2012) under the New Zealand Threat Classification System, and again in 2018 with a further comment that it was safe overseas.

References

chapmanii
Flora of New Zealand
Flora of Macquarie Island